Madame Butterfly is a 1915 silent film directed by Sidney Olcott. The film is based on the 1898 short story "Madame Butterfly" by John Luther Long and the opera Madama Butterfly.

Production
Reportedly, leading actress Mary Pickford fought constantly with Sidney Olcott about the character. Olcott wanted Pickford to be more reserved and thought she was "too Americanized to play a Japanese".

Plot
The film takes place in Japan in 1904. Lieutenant Pinkerton (Marshall Neilan) marries Cho-Cho-San 'Butterfly' (Mary Pickford), a 15-year-old Japanese geisha. Cho-Cho-San is lucky with her new husband and takes the marriage very seriously. Pinkterton, however, regards it as entertainment. He is not in love with her and plans to break off the wedding in a month. The American Consul (William T. Carleton)  begs him to break off the wedding as soon as possible, to avoid hurting her feelings. The lieutenant laughs him off.

After Pinkerton forces Cho-Cho-San to end their wedding reception early, her disapproving family disowns her. When Pinkerton is ordered to return to America, he promises Cho-Cho-San he will return before he leaves. Three years go by. Cho-Cho-San, now a mother, still believes Pinkerton will return someday, while he is engaged to an American woman. He sends her a letter to announce he will marry another woman, but Cho-Cho-San can't read.

Meanwhile, The Prince of Japan (David Burton) takes interest in Cho-Cho-San, but she refuses his company and claims she is still waiting for her husband. Sometime later, Pinkerton returns to Japan but he hands the American Consul some money as compensation for Cho-Cho-San and leaves again. When Cho-Cho-San comes to ask about her husband, she runs into Pinkerton's new American wife. The American woman asks Cho-Cho-San to give them her child, as he will be given better opportunities and prosperity under their parenting. Cho-Cho-San is crushed but complies and hands over her child. She kills herself in the final scene by walking into a river and drowning.

Cast

 Mary Pickford - Cho-Cho-San
 Marshall Neilan - Lieutenant Pinkerton
 Olive West - Suzuki
 Jane Hall - Adelaide
 Lawrence Wood - Cho-Cho-San's father
 Caroline Harris - Cho-Cho-San's mother
 M.W. Rale - The Nakodo
 William T. Carleton - The American Consul
 David Burton - The Prince
 Cesare Gravina - The Soothsayer
 Frank Dekum - Naval officer

DVD release
Madame Butterfly was released on Region 0 DVD-R by Alpha Video on July 7, 2015.

References

External links

Madame Butterfly stats at silentera.com
  Madame Butterfly website dedicated to  Sidney Olcott

1915 films
1915 drama films
Silent American drama films
American silent feature films
American black-and-white films
Films based on short fiction
American films based on plays
Films based on operas by Giacomo Puccini
Films directed by Sidney Olcott
Films set in the Meiji period
Films set in the 1900s
Paramount Pictures films
Films about interracial romance
Articles containing video clips
1910s American films